The 1984 Junior League World Series took place from August 14–18 in Taylor, Michigan, United States. Pearl City, Hawaii defeated Yabucoa, Puerto Rico in the championship game.

Teams

Results

Consolation Round

References

Junior League World Series
Junior League World Series
Junior